Chandigarh is a Lok Sabha parliamentary constituency and covers the entire Union Territory of Chandigarh.

Members of Parliament
The Chandigarh Lok Sabha constituency was created in 1967. The list of Member of Parliament (MP) is as follows:

Election results

General election 2019

General election 2014

General elections 2009

General elections 2004

References

Constituencies of the Lok Sabha
Elections in Chandigarh